Festuca earlei, also known as Earle's fescue, is a species of grass in the family Poaceae. This species is native to Arizona, Colorado, New Mexico, and Utah. Is perennial and prefers temperate biomes. This species was first described in 1905.

References

earlei